Monsieur le Directeur (Egyptian Arabic: الأسطي المدير translit: Elosta El Modeer, aliases: Handyman General Manager or The Engraver Manager) is a 1988 Egyptian drama film starring Salah Zulfikar and Laila Taher.

Synopsis 
The family of Hassanein, the senior government employee, suffers from financial troubles, making him unable to meet the needs of his family, a rich family proposes to marry their son Medhat to their daughter Mervat, so that the father falls into a financial predicament, which forces him to pursue the profession of engraver, in order to be able to meet his family's needs, which causes many problems.

Cast 

 Salah Zulfikar
 Laila Taher
 Fatma Mazhar
 Mahmoud El-Gendy
 Mustafa Metwalli
 Magdy Imam
 Azza Gamal
 Soad Hussein
 Nazim Shaarawy
 Gamal Ismail
 Child: Raafat Maher
 Abul Fotouh Amara
 Anwar Madkour
 Thanaa Lamloum
 Mustafa al-Kawawi
 Farouz al-Shahawi
 Nazmi Rizk
 Maysa Fathi
 Samir Rostom
 Hamdi Sharif
 Awatef Abdel Fattah
 Muhammadin Nassar
 MousA Salem
 Ahmed Abu Obeya
 Muhammad al-Qassas
 Sawsan Salem
 Abdel Aziz Issa
 Ahmed Badr
 Mahmoud Hafnawi
 Nawal Hashem
 Farida Abdel Aal
 Tawfiq al-Kurdi

Reception 
The film was a critical success and discussed an important issue concerning economic problems for Egyptian families.

References

External links 
 

20th-century Egyptian films
1988 films
1980s Arabic-language films
Films shot in Egypt